Brilliant Corners is an album by saxophonist James Spaulding featuring compositions by, or associated with Thelonious Monk which was recorded in 1988 and released on the Muse label.

Reception

The AllMusic review by  Scott Yanow stated "James Spaulding is a very distinctive altoist and flutist whose inside/outside playing can cover anything from bop to freer improvisations. On what was surprisingly only his third recording as a leader, Spaulding is heard at the peak of his powers, leading a quartet/quintet ... this is his definitive recording".

Track listing
All compositions by Thelonious Monk except where noted
 "Brilliant Corners" – 6:15
 "Let's Cool One" – 6:04
 "Down With It" (Bud Powell) – 3:58	
 "Reflections" – 6:08
 "I Mean You" (Coleman Hawkins, Thelonious Monk) – 5:41
 "Ask Me Now" – 6:03
 "Little Willie Leaps"  (Miles Davis) – 5:16
 "Little Rootie Tootie" – 6:00

Personnel
James Spaulding – alto saxophone, flute
Wallace Roney – trumpet
Mulgrew Miller – piano 
Ron Carter – bass 
Kenny Washington – drums

References

Muse Records albums
James Spaulding albums
1989 albums
Albums recorded at Van Gelder Studio
Thelonious Monk tribute albums